The Burry Port Urban District was an urban district in Carmarthenshire between 1903 and 1974, when it was absorbed into the District of Llanelli.

The first election was held in May 1903 after Carmarthenshire County Council agreed to establish new urban districts at Ammanford and Burry Port.

John Henry Williams was a chairman of the council.

Election Results

1903 Election 
Elected: Thos F. Wilkins White, leadworks manager 452; A. A. Lewis, tinplate works manager 362; William M. Howell, solicitor 346; D. Williams, builder 340; E. J. Bowen, tinplate manufacturer 339; E. E. Evans, accountant 334; T. Williams, bar cutter 327; Rev. J. H. Rees (Congregational Minister) 323; William Howell, fitter; 270 D Charles, chemist 256; D. Hughes, colliery manager 238; R. T. Hammond, agent 236; Robert Williams, salesman 227; Thomas Griffith. coal merchant 219; J. R. Griffiths, cashier 214.

Non-elected: William Bevan. brewers agent, 138; Thomas Bevnon, builder, 133; M. I. Davies. draper. 91; Thomas Davies, tailor, 68; Francis J. Evans, shipbroker, 135; Joseph Griffith, smelter. 87; Thomas Hughes, tailor, 147; Phillip Jones, sawyer, 194; Arthur Morgan, manager, 163; Fred. J Morgan, clerk. 193; John Rees, shoemaker, 177; W. B. Roderick, solicitor, 198.

1905 Election 
J.H. Williams, a local doctor and future Labour MP for Llanelli was elected as a Progressive at the head of the poll.

1906 Election 
A.A. Lewis was returned at the head of the poll.

1907 Election
Elected: R.G. Thomas 529; F.J. Evans 415; R. Roberts 361; *R.T. Hammond 354; J. Leyshon 296.

Non-Elected: J. Rowlands 229; Jophn Edwards 164; Philip Eynon 130.

Source:

1909 Election 
Six members were returned due to an occasional vacancy.

References

Urban districts of Wales
Burry Port